Carbajales de Alba is a  village and municipality located in the northwest of the province of Zamora in the autonomous community Castile-Leon of Spain. Carbajales' population is approximately 700.

Notable people
Pedro d'Alva y Astorga

External links
www.carbajales.com

References

Municipalities of the Province of Zamora